Fowlerichthys senegalensis, known as the Senegalese frogfish, is a species of fish in the family Antennariidae, the frogfishes. It is native to the Eastern Atlantic, where it may be found off the African coast from Morocco to Angola, including Senegal, the country for which it is named. It occurs at a depth range of 10 to 80 m (33 to 262 ft), and it has been reported from both marine and brackish environments. It is a demersal oviparous fish that reaches 28.5 cm (11.2 inches) SL.

References 

Antennariidae
Fish described in 1959